Milat is the national daily newspaper published in Turkey. It started broadcasting on October 20, 2011.
With a daily circulation of around 50 thousand, Milat newspaper is the 24th best-selling newspaper in Turkey as of October 2014. It is the 12th newspaper with the highest official advertisement payment from state resources, with an official advertisement of 959 thousand 272 TL in the first 4 months of 2014. has been. 
Founded under the leadership of people who left the Milli Gazete , Milat newspaper published ina line close to the HAS Party in its early years. However, after the HAS Party joined the AK Party in 2012 , it started to broadcast in a pro-AK Party line.

References 

Newspapers published in Istanbul
Turkish-language newspapers
Publications established in 2011
2011 establishments in Turkey
Daily newspapers published in Turkey
Eyüp